The Advisory Committee on Works of Art is a committee of the House of Commons of the United Kingdom. The Committee is responsible for purchasing works of art for the House of Commons; advising the Speaker on all matters relating to Commons' works of art; and advising the Speaker, the Curator of Works of Art, and other officials with respect to the interpretation (e.g., explanatory signs and brochures), care, and management of artwork, furniture, furnishings, and decorative elements within the Palace of Westminster and the other buildings of the Parliamentary Estate.

Members
 the members of the committee are:

References

Committees of the British House of Commons